This is a list of historic places in Regional Municipality of Waterloo, Ontario, containing heritage sites listed on the Canadian Register of Historic Places (CRHP), all of which are designated as historic places either locally, provincially, territorially, nationally, or by more than one level of government.

List of historic places

See also

 List of oldest buildings and structures in the Regional Municipality of Waterloo
 List of historic places in Ontario
 List of National Historic Sites of Canada in Ontario

References

Waterloo